The 2012 CARIFTA Games were held in the Bermuda National Stadium in Hamilton, Bermuda between April 6—9, 2012, the fourth time in which the event was held in Bermuda. The other years being 1975, 1980, 2004.  A detailed analysis of the results and an appreciation of the games has been given elsewhere.

Records
A total of 9 new games records were set.

Austin Sealy Award
The Austin Sealy Trophy for the most outstanding athlete of the games was awarded to Anthonique Strachan of the Bahamas.

Medal summary
Complete results can be found on World-Track, on the World Junior Athletics History
website, and on the original games websites.

Boys under 20 (Junior)

: Open event for both junior and youth athletes.

*: Initially, Jevaughn Minzie of Jamaica came in second
in 10.33s.  However, following a protest of the Bahamas and Anguilla, he was
disqualified for a false start.

Girls under 20 (Junior)

: Open event for both junior and youth athletes.

Boys under 17 (Youth)

**: Miguel van Assen from Suriname finished second in triple jump reaching 14.57m (0.6 m/s); However, he was not entitled to win a medal (see below).

Girls under 17 (Youth)

Medal table (unofficial)
The unofficial count is in accordance with the medal count published elsewhere.

Participation (unofficial)
Detailed result lists can be found on World-Track, on the World Junior Athletics History
website, and on the original games websites. The games saw the first appearance of athletes
representing Bonaire after dissolution of the Netherlands Antilles.
Athletes from Suriname were treated as guests (see below).
An unofficial count yields the number of about 419
athletes, including 10 guests (227 junior (under-20) including 6 guests and 192 youth (under-17) including 4 guests) from about 24
countries + 1 guest country (athletes marked as "unattached" in the original result lists):

Anguilla (4)
Antigua and Barbuda (6)
Aruba (4)
Bahamas (71)
Barbados (35)
Bermuda (53)
/Bonaire (2)
British Virgin Islands (16)

Cayman Islands (5)
Curaçao (7)
Dominica (4)
/French Guiana (5)
Grenada (9)
/Guadeloupe (13)
Guyana (7)
Jamaica (71)

/Martinique (9)
Montserrat (3)
Saint Kitts and Nevis (13)
Saint Lucia (9)
Sint Maarten (1)
Trinidad and Tobago (44)
Turks and Caicos Islands (14)
U.S. Virgin Islands (4)
Suriname*** (10)

***: Guest athletes (see below).

Suriname
There was an ongoing dispute between the Surinamese officials Robby Rijssel and Delano
Landvreugd, both gentlemen claiming to lead the Surinamese Athletiek Bond and to
represent Suriname at the IAAF.  As a result of this, two different
delegations independently tried to register groups of athletes for the games.  Alain Jean-Pierre from Haïti, board member of
both the North American, Central American and Caribbean Athletic Association (NACAC) and the Central American and Caribbean Athletic Confederation (CACAC), explained that normally both groups would have to be
suspended from the games following the rules.  Nevertheless, there was a
joint decision by the NACAC, the CACAC, and the local organizing committee in favour of the young athletes: all of them from both delegations
were allowed to compete at the games, but they were treated only as guest athletes and
appeared in the result lists as "unattached", rather than from Suriname.  As a
consequence, the athletes could not participate in the parade of the opening
ceremony, and they were not considered to be eligible
for winning medals.  The victim of the argument between the Surinamese officials
was 15-year-old triple jumper Miguel van Assen who came in second in his
category, but was not entitled to receive the silver medal.

References

External links
 CARIFTA Games 2012 official web site

World Junior Athletics History

CARIFTA Games
CARIFTA Games
CARIFTA Games
International athletics competitions hosted by Bermuda
2012 in Caribbean sport